During the 2018–19 season, Ajax participated in the Eredivisie, the KNVB Cup and the UEFA Champions League. With winning both the competition and the cup, it meant the first double won since the 2001–02 season. In the Champions League, they knocked-out defending champions Real Madrid in the round of 16. After beating Juventus in the quarter-final, they reached a Champions League semi-final for the first time since 1997. Ajax were seconds away from reaching the final by beating Tottenham Hotspur, until Lucas Moura scored a last-minute goal, sending Tottenham to the final in Madrid on away goals.

On an individual level, Dušan Tadić was the biggest surprise; signed from Southampton in June 2018 for just €11.4 million, the 30-year old unexpectedly became the club's leading goalscorer with a total of 38, including 9 goals in the Champions League. He doubled his personal season record for scoring, as well as earned the right to be the team's captain for the next season.

Player statistics 

Appearances for competitive matches only

|-
|colspan="14"|Players sold or loaned out after the start of the season:

|}
As of 15 May 2019

Team statistics

2018–19 selection by nationality

Eredivisie standings 2018–19

Topscorers

Competitions

Overview

Eredivisie

League table

Matches

KNVB Cup

UEFA Champions League

Second qualifying round

Third qualifying round

Play-off round

Group stage

Knockout phase

Round of 16

Quarter-finals

Semi-finals

Friendlies

Transfers for 2018–19
For a list of all Dutch football transfers in the summer window (1 July 2018 to 31 August 2018) please see List of Dutch football transfers summer 2018. For a list of all Dutch football transfers in the winter window (1 January 2019 to 1 February 2019) please see List of Dutch football transfers winter 2018–19.

Arrivals 
 The following players moved to AFC Ajax.

Departures 
 The following players moved from AFC Ajax.

References

Ajax
AFC Ajax seasons
Ajax
Dutch football championship-winning seasons